Afolabi is a name of Yoruba origin that means "born in wealth and high status". Notable people with the name include:

 Afolabi Olabimtan (1932-2003), Nigerian politician and writer
 Ola Afolabi (born 1980), British boxer
 Bidemi Afolabi (born 1995), Nigerian footballer
 Olabisi Afolabi (born 1975), Nigerian athlete
 Rabiu Afolabi (born 1980), Nigerian footballer
 S. A. Afolabi (born 1966), Nigerian novelist and short story writer
 Oladapo Afolabi (born 1953), Nigerian academic and public servant
 Afolabi Olumide, Nigerian academic and pioneering vice chancellor of Lagos State University
 Afolabi Drake (Ayedrake) CEO Delord Biz Palace, Federal Poly Ilaro, Ogun State and Yewa South Local Government Chairmanship Candidate under the umbrella of PDP 2021.

 Alhaji Chief Tijani Afolabi, a Nigerian businessman and philanthropist who lived in Ouagadougou, Burkina Faso.

References

Yoruba given names
Yoruba-language surnames